Kaibabvenator swiftae is a very large, extinct ctenacanthiform shark that lived in marine environments in what is now Arizona, during the Middle Permian Period. K. swiftae is known from large teeth up to 30 millimeters long found in the Kachina Microsite, of the lower Fossil Mountain Member, in the Kaibab Formation near Flagstaff, Arizona. The specific name honors researcher Sandra Swift for her paleontological contributions to Northern Arizona University.

References

Permian fish of North America
Fish enigmatic taxa
Monotypic prehistoric animal genera